Thomas Madox was a historian.

See also
Tommy Maddox, American football player
Tom Maddox, American science fiction writer
Thomas Herbert Maddock, English MP